The 1936 Iowa State Senate elections took place as part of the biennial 1936 United States elections. Iowa voters elected state senators in 32 of the state senate's 50 districts. State senators serve four-year terms in the Iowa State Senate.

A statewide map of the 50 state Senate districts in the 1936 elections is provided by the Iowa General Assembly here.

The primary election on June 1, 1936 determined which candidates appeared on the November 3, 1936 general election ballot.

Following the previous election, Democrats had control of the Iowa state Senate with 28 seats to Republicans' 22 seats. Due to some vacancies and special elections, by election day 1936, Democrats held 26 seats to Republicans' 24.

To claim control of the chamber from Democrats, the Republicans needed to net 2 Senate seats.

Republicans gained control of the Iowa State Senate following the 1936 general election with the balance of power shifting to Republicans holding 28 seats and Democrats having 22 seats (a net gain of 4 seats for Republicans).

Summary of Results
Note: The 18 holdover Senators not up for re-election are not listed on this table.

Source:

Detailed Results
NOTE: The 18 districts that did not hold elections in 1936 are not listed here.

Note: If a district does not list a primary, then that district did not have a competitive primary (i.e., there may have only been one candidate file for that district).

District 2

District 3

District 4

District 5

District 6

District 8

District 11

District 14

District 15

District 16

District 17

District 18

District 19

District 23

District 24

District 25

District 26

District 27

District 28

District 30

District 31

District 32

District 33

District 36

District 37

District 39

District 40

District 41

District 43

District 46

District 47

District 49

See also
 United States elections, 1936
 United States House of Representatives elections in Iowa, 1936
 Elections in Iowa

References

1936 Iowa elections
Iowa Senate
Iowa Senate elections